The  is a kei car with semi-coupé styling manufactured by Daihatsu. It was launched in Japan in December 1986, and discontinued in August 1993 after had been largely replaced by the Opti in 1992. While having coupé lines, most of the Leezas sold in Japan were technically commercial vehicles (with strapping points and temporary rear seats) to take advantage of ample tax breaks for such vehicles.

550 cc model (L100) 
Power output from the carburetted 547 cc EB-series three-cylinder engines were originally either , depending on whether a turbocharger was fitted. In late 1987, a limited edition variant called Cha Cha was introduced, aimed at women around the age of 30 and only available in black with discreet red pinstripes and equipped with standard air conditioning. In January 1989, the TR-ZZ variant, a fuel-injected  version was added, followed by Club Sports edition in October which offered lowered suspension and body kits. At the 1989 Tokyo Motor Show, a prototype two-seat "Leeza Spider" was shown.

Reviewers said while the Lezza offered a modern and clean design for its time, and with an airy interior, the sloping rear glasshouse made the rear seat rather cramped. The front seats were claimed spacious, but at the expense of the rear space — fitting four adults in the Leeza would not be comfortable for any of them. In short, all design parameters of the Leeza were designed with city use in mind, making it not very well suited to highway use.

660 cc model (L111) 

In March 1990, the kei car regulations changed. Unlike its competitor, the Suzuki Cervo, Daihatsu chose to update the Leeza, giving it an updated chassis code L111. The 660 cc Leeza, arriving a little later than its more popular sibling the Mira, in August 1990, was available in R, Cha Cha and OXY trim lines. The Cha Cha became a regularly available model rather than a special edition. The larger engine and slightly enlarged bodywork made for a more usable car, and allowed for the fitment of more safety equipment. The standard engine was a naturally aspirated, carburetted single-cam engine with four valves per cylinder, producing . However, the tax advantages for "faux" commercial vehicles had shrunk to the point of irrelevance, and the updated Leeza was only sold as a passenger car, limiting its market.

Five months after the update, the turbocharged OXY-R (with the maximum  allowed to kei cars) arrived, with a prominent bonnet vent for the intercooler. Daihatsu also went through the effort of making the two-seat roadster version of the Leeza called the "Leeza Spider" ready for production. The Spider received a standard leather interior. There was also a Spider-based show car in 1991, called the FX-228. The Spider (chassis code L111SK), only fitted with the turbocharged engine, arrived in November 1991 and lasted until the end of production in August 1993.

References 

Leeza
Cars introduced in 1986
1990s cars
Kei cars
Hatchbacks
Roadsters
Front-wheel-drive vehicles
Cars discontinued in 1993